Jana Kolarič (born 17 September 1954) is a Slovene author and translator. She is the author of plays and novels for both children and adults, and has been recognised as an exceptional artist by the Ministry of Culture. She has won a number of literary awards.

Career

Jana Kolarič was born on 17 September 1954 in Maribor, where she attended elementary and secondary school.
In 1979 she completed her AGRF (Akademija za Gledališče, Radio, Film) course in Ljubljana with a degree in film and TV directing.
She worked in a variety of jobs after completing her studies, including as consultant for educational TV, lecturer in art education, mentor of a drama group, cultural animator, journalist and  editor of school books for a publishing house.
As of 2010 she was working as a translator of literature, particularly poetry and fairy tales, and by lecturing.
She is married and the mother of four children.

Literary activity

Jana Kolarič has regularly published poems and plays.
In 1976 she created a successful play for children, Salon Expon.
While working for the Tuma publishing house she was responsible for Primadona, a collection of 12 plays with detailed staging instructions adapted to schools.
She joined the Slovene Writers' Association (DSP: Društvo slovenskih pisateljev) in January 2004. 
She received recognition as a leading artist from the Ministry of Culture in October 2004.
In 2004 she published a drama for adults, Kdo le so oni?, and in 2005 a collection of puzzles, Ugibanke male, oblecene v šale.
Kolarič drew the puzzles in this book, which was designed for children.

Kolarič's debut science fiction novel Izpred kongresa, a satire of Slovene society featuring adults being cloned at a huge clinic, was first published in 2006 with the funding of the Ministry of Culture of the Republic of Slovenia. It received special mention by the jury in a modern Slovene novel competition run by the Mladinska Knjiga publishing house. Kolarič translated two children's picture books for the Miš publishing house: Moja sestra Zala and Kuštravi Slave z Mlekarske pristave.
She published a collection of short dramatic scripts Dobro jutro, lutke (2007) for the Genija publishing house.
In 2008 she published her second novel, co-authored with Tatjano Kokalj, Draga Alina, draga Brina. As of 2010 her second co-authored novel was ready for publication, Zima z ognjenim šalom.

In a 2009 interview Kolarič noted that the market for Slovene literature was small and it was hard to make money.
Most writers had a full-time job, usually in education, and wrote when they had the time.
She had to take whatever work was available, including teaching, translating, writing books, editing and sometimes helping stage plays.
She felt that the media raised impossible expectations of a woman's role, describing a super-woman with a stylish way of life who is the perfect professional artist, who supports her children, husband and parents, and who is a breadwinner and markets their own books.
She felt that women writers had to overcome prejudice against negative views of emotional aspects of their work, labeled as "sentimental", "melodramatic" or "weak".
She had won competitions only when she consciously adopted a male style of writing.

Selected awards
Kolarič's radio play Upanje na bogastvo won third prize at the 60th anniversary competition of Trieste Radio Studios.
Trieste Radio Studios staged the play in 2007.
Her radio play Odiseja 3000 won first prize in the 2007 Radia Slovenija  competition, and was staged by Radio Slovenija in 2008.
The children's play is about life on different planets and what is new on earth. 
Her short story Barva marsovskih hlac was selected in the International Board on Books for Young People Slovene section as representative of Slovenia in the March 2009 world youth anthology in India.
In 2011 her story Goli goli won third place in a competition organized by Ljubljana's Student Publishing Company.
In 2013 Jana Kolaric won the first Literary Death Match competition in Ljubljana, where she read a short story with a tragic and unexpected end about a woman babysitting her niece.

Publications
Books published by Kolarič include:

 Published with Astrid Lindgren's Pika

 Published with the financial support of the Ministry of Culture of the Republic of Slovenia

Translations by Kolarič include:

Notes

Sources

1954 births
Living people
Slovenian translators
20th-century Slovenian writers
21st-century Slovenian writers
Writers from Maribor
20th-century Slovenian women writers
21st-century Slovenian women writers